The Michigan State Law Review is a law review published by students at Michigan State University College of Law. It is the flagship journal of the school and it publishes five issues per year. According to the Washington & Lee Law Journal Ranking, Michigan State Law Review was the 48th highest-ranked flagship legal journal in 2022, a dramatic increase from its ranking of 332rd in 2003. The journal hosts an annual academic conference of global legal experts with past events covering issues such as autonomous vehicles, quantitative legal analysis, civil rights, and intellectual property. Professor David Blankfein-Tabachnick has served as Faculty Advisor of the journal since his appointment in 2016. In 2018, the journal began publishing an annual "Visionary Article Series," which features the work of one prominent legal scholar per year.

Michigan State Law Review has published the works of numerous legal scholars, such as Robert Post, a legal scholar and former dean of Yale Law School, Mark Lemley, a professor at Stanford Law School and renowned intellectual property scholar, Scott L. Kafker, a justice on the Supreme Judicial Court of Massachusetts, and Nathalie Martin, professor of consumer and bankruptcy law at University of New Mexico School of Law. The journal has also published the scholarship of Dennis Archer, a former Michigan Supreme Court justice and an alumnus of the school.

History 
Prior to the founding of the Michigan State Law Review, the school published a periodical known as The Brief Case. Although this was met with approval, potential authors who were unaffiliated with the school requested to be published. In response, a law review was established. The Michigan State Law Review, then known as the Detroit Law Review, released its first publication in June 1931. At the time, the school was known as the Detroit College of Law. After seven years, the Detroit Law Review ceased publication in 1938, but was brought back for three issues during the 1947-48 academic year. Following another hiatus, the journal was revived in 1975.

In conjunction with the school's integration into Michigan State University, the journal went through a series of name changes: Detroit College of Law Review (1975-1995), Detroit College of Law at Michigan State University Law Review (1995-1999), The Law Review of Michigan State University, Detroit College of Law (1999-2003), Michigan State DCL Law Review (2003-2003), and Michigan State Law Review (2003–present).

Publications  
The Michigan State Law Review publishes five issues per year, one of which is a symposium that focuses on a particular legal topic. Additionally, the journal publishes an annual "Visionary Article Series" article.

Symposia  
Each year, one of the Michigan State Law Review'''s issues is a symposium, a legal academic conference that focuses on a particular area of law. In the 2018-2019 academic year, the Michigan State Law Review transitioned to a book symposium format, where authors visit the College of Law and workshop their pieces for the symposium in front of journal members and law school faculty. In recent years, the annual symposia topics have been as follows:
 2013 (Fall): Whether the United States should become a party to the United Nations Convention on the Elimination of All Forms of Discrimination Against Women
 2014 (Spring): Reflections on Brown v. Board of Education and the Civil Rights Act of 1964, in conjunction with the Michigan State University College of Education and the University of Missouri–Kansas City
 2014 (Fall): Public Domain(s): Law, Generating Knowledge, and Furthering Innovation in the Information Economy
 2015 (Spring): Civil rights and persuasive arguments in issues such as same-sex rights, abortion law, racial conflicts, voting rights, and animal rights
 2015 (Fall): Quantitative analysis in law
 2016 (Spring): Autonomous vehicle technology and the law
 2017 (Spring): The emerging legal analytics industry and empirical legal studies
 2018 (Spring): Truth and Reconciliation in Post-Ferguson America
 2018-2019: The intersection of private values and public law
 2019-2020: The intersection of law, language, and technology
 2020-2021: Property Ownership and Entitlement: Gender, Religion, & Culture
 2021-2022: The Evolving Realm of Soft IP: Copyrights, Trademarks, Trade Secrets, and Publicity Rights

 Visionary Article Series 
In 2018, Michigan State Law Review began publishing a "Visionary Article Series" that aims to "honor a single legal scholar who has had a profound impact on a field of law by publishing a work of his or hers with a special designation." In the inaugural year, the journal published an article on administrative regulation by Richard Revesz, director of the American Law Institute and professor and former dean at the New York University School of Law. In 2019, the series continued with an article by Yale Law School professor and former dean Robert Post that analyzed the chief justiceship of William Howard Taft. In 2020, the journal published an article by the Guido Calabresi Professor of Law at Yale Law School, professor Daniel Markovits. Currently, Michigan State Law Review is in the process of publishing the 2021 Visionary Scholar Article by Eduardo Peñalver, professor and dean of Cornell Law School, which will precede a planned 2022 article by Akhil Amar, professor of law at Yale Law School.

 Notable Authors Published Michigan State Law Review'' has published the works of many prominent legal scholars, including:
 Akhil Amar, professor at Yale Law School who the Supreme Court of the United States has cited to on 45 occasions
 Dennis Archer, former Michigan Supreme Court justice and former mayor of Detroit, Michigan
 Anita Bernstein, legal scholar and Professor of Law at Brooklyn Law School
 Anya Bernstein, researcher and professor at the University of Buffalo School of Law
 Jim Chen, constitutional law scholar and former dean of the University of Louisville Brandeis School of Law
 Deborah Denno, legal scholar and professor at the Fordham University School of Law
 Seymour Drescher, historian and professor at the University of Pittsburgh
 Paul Finkelman, legal historian and president of Gratz College
 Clayton Gillette, professor at NYU School of Law
 Scott L. Kafker, Associate Justice of the Supreme Judicial Court of Massachusetts
 Edmund Kitch, professor at the University of Virginia School of Law
 Lisa Larrimore Ouellette, associate professor at Stanford Law School
 Mark Lemley, professor of law at Stanford Law School and the Director of the Stanford Law School Program in Law, Science & Technology, as well as a founding partner of the law firm of Durie Tangri LLP
 Michael A. Livermore, professor at University of Virginia School of Law
 Julia Mahoney, professor at the University of Virginia School of Law
 Nathalie Martin, legal researcher and professor at the University of New Mexico School of Law
 Linda McClain, professor at the Boston University School of Law and former professor at Hofstra Law School
 Robert Merges, professor at the University of California, Berkeley School of Law
 Frank Partnoy, legal scholar and professor of the University of California Berkeley School of Law
 Richard J. Pierce, legal scholar and professor at the George Washington University School of Law
 Robert Post, legal scholar and former dean of Yale Law School
 Richard Revesz, director of the American Law Institute and professor at the New York University School of Law
 Duane Rudolph, former visiting assistant professor of law at Peking University School of Transnational Law
 Loren A. Smith, Senior Judge of the United States Court of Federal Claims
 Matthew Stephenson, professor at Harvard Law School
 Shlomit Yanisky-Ravid, professor at Fordham University School of Law
 Edward J. McCaffery, professor at USC Gould School of Law
 Jens David Ohlin, Dean of Cornell Law School

Editors-in-Chief 

 2011-2012: Amanda Josephine-Hicks Frank
 2012-2013: Lisa Colomba Ferro Hackett
 2013-2014: Rachael Roseman
 2014-2015: Leah Jurss
 2015-2016: Jennifer Muse
 2016-2017: Christopher Kozak
 2017-2018: Andrew Newton
 2018-2019: Celia Kaechele
 2019-2020: Emily Sosolik
 2020-2021: Kylee Nemetz
 2021-2022: Brandon Paul Cross
 2022-2023: Hugh J. Theut

References

External links 
 Official website
 Archive of published issues at Digital Commons

American law journals
General law journals
Michigan State University
Publications established in 1931
English-language journals
University of Michigan
1931 establishments in Michigan
Law journals edited by students
5 times per year journals